Katharine Blake (born 1970) is a British singer, songwriter and musician, originally from London. She was the lead singer of gothic rock band Miranda Sex Garden, and is a founding member, singer, and musical director of the musical group Mediæval Bæbes.

She was married to Nick Marsh, the lead singer of rock band Flesh for Lulu, until his death in 2015. Their first child was born in February 2007. Their second daughter was born in 2009.

In 2006 Stories From the Moon, an ethereal collaborative concept album, was released. It included contributions from Katharine Blake.

In 2015, Katharine Blake and Nick Marsh's collaborative self-titled album From The Deep was released on Bellissima Records.  It included contributions from many of their musical past working, including members from Miranda Sex Garden, Naked Goat and Mediæval Bæbes.

Discography

Albums 
 Midnight Flower (2007)

Soundtracks 
 UK18 (2017) - Song: "She Sung of Love"

Appearances 
 UK18 (2017) - Our Lady of the Flowers - Directed by Andrew Tiernan
 Fall of the Louse of Usher (2002) - Unholy Reveller - Directed by Ken Russell

References

External links
 Interview and acoustic session on Phoenix FM's Interesting Alternative Show
 Mediaeval Baebes
 Miranda Sex Garden
 Katharine Blake on IMDb

1970 births
English songwriters
Living people
Singers from London
People educated at Purcell School
21st-century English women singers
21st-century English singers